The Dark Abyss is a novel by F. J. Thwaites about the Korean War.

The book was the first published by a company Thwaites set up for English readers, Harcourts.

References

External links
The Dark Abyss at AustLit

1951 Australian novels